Selbe: One Among Many (originally as Selbé et tant d'autres, is a 1983 Senegalese documentary short directed by Safi Faye and produced by Pierre Hoffmann for Faye Films.

The film received positive reviews and won several awards at international film festivals.

Plot
The film rotates on the daily life of a Senegalese village woman, Selbe, and examines the economic and social roles of rural African women.

Cast

References

External links
 
 Selbe

1983 films
1983 documentary films
1980s short documentary films
Senegalese short documentary films
Wolof-language films
1980s French-language films
1983 multilingual films